Elizabeth Lejonhjärta and Victoria Lejonhjärta (born 9 October 1990, Norrbotten, Sweden) are Swedish twin models, bloggers, writers and social media personalities, best known for their collaborations with Canadian rapper Drake.

Early and personal lives
The twins were born in the Sápmi cultural region, in Northern Sweden, of Swedish, Sami, Gambian, and  Senegalese heritage. They describe their childhood home as "semi-Caribbean". Their mother is Swedish, Tornedalian and Sami; their father has heritage from Gambia, Senegal and Sierra Leone. Their younger  half-brother Malcolmx's father is from Saint Vincent and the Grenadines. Growing up in the northern Sweden region Norrbotten, they experienced racism and bullying. They were raised in Luleå. They are environmentalists who collect their own water in a Swedish forest for health purposes and reside in the mountains of Överkalix. Drake has a tattoo dedicated to them.

Career
They appear in Drake's album artwork for his album Views and his music videos for Please Forgive Me and Nice for What; they also frequently model for his OVO merchandise. Together, they have also modeled for H&M, Nike, Inc., Vogue, Cheap Monday, Eytys, Calvin Klein, Max Factor, Volvo, Åhléns, Sonos, and Chanel.

Videography

References

1990 births
Living people
Swedish people of Gambian descent
Swedish people of Senegalese descent
Swedish people of Sierra Leonean descent
Swedish Sámi people
Tornedalians
People from Luleå
Swedish female models
Swedish Internet celebrities
Swedish environmentalists
Swedish women environmentalists
People from Norrbotten
Twin models
Identical twins